The Matambo–Phombeya High Voltage Power Line is a high voltage electricity power line under construction, connecting the high voltage substation at Matambo, Tete Province, Mozambique to another high voltage substation at Phombeya, Balaka District, Malawi.

Location 
The power line starts at Matambo, in Tete Province Mozambique, at a 400kV substation there.

Overview 
The construction of this power line has been on the books, as far back as 2007. The World Bank initially approved a $93 million line of credit for this project, but cancelled it in 2010. The main objective of the electricity transmission project is to connect the electricity grids of Malawi and Mozambique. This will allow Malawi to purchase 50 megawatts of power from the Cahora Bassa Hydroelectric Power Station in Mozambique. Also, through the interconnections of the Southern African Power Pool (SAPP), Malawi will be able to import a further 150 megawatts from South Africa through the same power line.

Construction in Mozambique 
The entire project in both countries is valued at US$154 million, borrowed from the World Bank, KfW and the European Investment Bank.

The engineering, procurement and construction (EPC) contract was awarded to L&T Infrastructure Development Projects Limited (Lasern & Toubro), an Indian company. That line will cost over US$35 million. The new 400kV substation at Matambo will be constructed by a consortium comprising Sinohydro of China and Cepco1 of Malaysia, at a budgeted cost of US$21 million.

Construction in Malawi
Each country is responsible for the transmission infrastructure within its territory. Completion of this energy infrastructure is expected in 2023.

In 2019 the World Bank lent US$15 million to the government of Malawi towards the construction of this line, along with a new 220kV substation in Phombeya, Malawi.

See also 
 Southern African Power Pool
 Energy in Malawi

References

External links 
 Overcoming Grid Constraints: Attempts To Enhance Power Trade In Southern Africa As at December 2017.
 Malawi-Mozambique: a power line will interconnect the two countries As of 7 December 2021.

High-voltage transmission lines in Mozambique
High-voltage transmission lines in Malawi
Energy in Malawi
Proposed electric power transmission systems
Proposed electric power infrastructure in Malawi
Proposed electric power infrastructure in Mozambique